The University of Kansas School of Law is the law school of the University of Kansas, a public research university in Lawrence, Kansas. The University of Kansas Law School was founded in 1893, replacing the earlier Department of Law, which had existed since 1878. The school has more than 60 faculty members and approximately 315 students. The school is accredited by the American Bar Association and is a member of the Association of American Law Schools.

With over 370,000 volumes, the Wheat Law Library at the University of Kansas School of Law is the second largest and oldest law library in the state of Kansas.

Admissions 
For the class entering in 2021, the school accepted 53.86% of applicants with 32.16% of accepted applicants enrolling. The class had an average LSAT score of 158 and an average undergraduate GPA of 3.69.

Centers and programs 
Shook, Hardy & Bacon Center for Excellence in Advocacy
Polsinelli Transactional Law Center
Tribal Law and Government Center
Advocacy Skills Certificate
Business and Commercial Law Certificate
Environment, Energy and Natural Resources Law Certificate
International Trade and Finance Certificate
Media, Law and Technology Certificate
Tax Law Certificate
Study Abroad Program

Ten clinical and field placement programs permit students, acting under faculty supervision, to develop legal skills and learn professional values in actual practice settings: Criminal Prosecution Field Placement, Elder Law Field Placement, Judicial Field Placement, Legal Aid Clinic, 6th Semester in Washington, D.C. Externship, Medical-Legal Partnership Field Placement, Paul E. Wilson Project for Innocence and Post-Conviction Remedies, and Tribal Judicial Support Clinic.

Publications at the University of Kansas School of Law 
The Kansas Journal of Law & Public Policy
The Kansas Law Review
KU Law Magazine
Dean's Note
Hearsay: News from KU's Wheat Law Library

Curriculum 
The first-year curriculum includes Civil Procedure, Constitutional Law, Contracts, Criminal Law, Torts, and Property. In addition, students take Lawyering I and II, legal writing classes designed to teach legal research and writing in a context that emphasizes professionalism and practical skills. All first-year students have one of their classes in a small section of approximately 20 students, providing an informal learning atmosphere.

Employment 
According to The University of Kansas official 2020 ABA-required disclosures, 72% of the Class of 2019 obtained full-time, long-term, bar passage-required employment 10 months after graduation.

Costs 
The total cost of attendance (indicating the cost of tuition, fees, and living expenses) at the University of Kansas for the 2020-2021 academic year was $40,421 for residents of Kansas and $46,456 for residents of other states. 90 percent of students received grants for the 2020-2021 academic year.

Notable alumni 
Sheila Bair – Former Chairman of the Federal Deposit Insurance Corporation
Valerie L. Baldwin – Assistant Secretary of the Army (Financial Management and Comptroller) (2004–06)
Mary Beck Briscoe - Judge of the United States Court of Appeals for the Tenth Circuit
Sam Brownback – United States Ambassador-at-Large for International Religious Freedom, former Governor of Kansas, former United States Senator for Kansas (1996-2011), former Member of Congress representing Kansas's 2nd congressional district (1995–96), former Secretary of the Kansas Department of Agriculture (1986-1990)(1991-1993), and former White House Fellow under President George H. W. Bush (1990–91).
Jerry Moran – United States Senator for Kansas and former Member of Congress representing Kansas's 1st congressional district (1997-2011).
Carol Beier – former Justice of the Kansas Supreme Court
Chris Biggs – former Kansas Secretary of State
Robert Coldsnow, Kansas state legislator
C. H. Elting, Durant, Oklahoma - Justice of the Oklahoma State Supreme Court (1921-1923), died in office
Howard Engleman – All-American basketball player at Kansas
Phillip D. Kline – former attorney (license indefinitely suspended), former Kansas state legislator and Kansas Attorney General, assistant professor Liberty University School of Law
Lawrence E. Meyers - former Judge of the Texas Court of Criminal Appeals
Robert H. Miller – Chief Justice of the Kansas Supreme Court (1988-1990)
Carlos Murguia – former Judge of the United States District Court for the District of Kansas
Janet Murguia – President and Chief Executive Officer of the National Council of La Raza
Mary H. Murguia – Chief Judge of the United States Court of Appeals for the Ninth Circuit
Lawton Nuss – former Chief Justice of the Kansas Supreme Court
Julie A. Robinson – Chief Judge of the United States District Court for the District of Kansas
David Stras – Judge of the United States Court of Appeals for the Eighth Circuit
Major General Clyde J. Tate II – Deputy Judge Advocate General of the United States Army

Notable faculty

 Christine Arguello (born 1955), federal judge
 Elinor Schroeder, Paul E. Wilson Distinguished Professor Emeritus

References

External links 
 

University of Kansas
Educational institutions established in 1893
Law schools in Kansas
1893 establishments in Kansas